Kimberly Williams (born October 14, 1974) is a former professional basketball player who played two seasons for the Utah Starzz of the Women's National Basketball Association (WNBA).

Early life and college career
Born and raised in South Side, Chicago, Williams graduated from Marshall High School in 1993 and was Illinois "Ms. Basketball" as a senior.

She helped guide the Westark Community College (now University of Arkansas-Fort Smith) to back-to-back appearances in the NJCAA Women's Basketball Championship. The team were national runner-us in 1994 and won the national championship in 1995, going 67–2 cumulatively in Williams' two seasons. She was the first women's basketball player from Arkansas-Fort Smith to be drafted in the WNBA.

Williams transferred to DePaul University, where she  played from 1995 to 1997. As a senior at DePaul in 1996–97, Williams was Conference USA Player of the Year after scoring 25.1 points per game, second highest nationally, and leading C-USA in assists (5.6 apg) and steals (4.52 spg).

Professional career
Drafted in the fourth round (28th overall) by the Utah Starzz in the 1997 WNBA draft, Williams began her professional career in the WNBA with the Starzz. In 58 games (20 starts) in two years, Williams averaged 7.8 points, 2.4 rebounds, and 1.8 assists.

The Minnesota Lynx selected Williams third overall in the 1999 WNBA expansion draft, but Williams never played for the Lynx. Following the 1998 WNBA season, Williams played overseas, beginning with Sporting in Greece from 1998 to 1999, followed by Holon in Israel from 1999 to 2000 and Fiskobirlik in Turkey from 2000 to 2001.

In 2004, Williams returned to the United States with the Chicago Blaze of the National Women's Basketball League, playing two seasons. Williams played in Europe and Israel from 2004 to 2014, most recently with Dynamo Kyiv from 2012 to 2014. Williams left Ukraine as military conflicts between Russia and Ukraine began.

Williams signed with the Chicago Lady Steam of the Women's American Basketball Association in 2014. She returned to DePaul University later that year to finish her bachelor's degree.

Honors and awards

College
2x first team NJCAA All-American
MVP of NCJAA national tournament as a sophomore
Conference USA Player of the Year 
Third team Associated Press All-American 
Kodak/WBCA All-District honors
First team All-Conference USA honors 
Second team All-Conference USA honors.
University of Arkansas-Fort Smith Athletic Hall of Fame
Lions Athletic Hall of Fame

References

1974 births
Living people
All-American college women's basketball players
American expatriate basketball people in Greece
American expatriate basketball people in Israel
American expatriate basketball people in Poland
American expatriate basketball people in Turkey
American expatriate basketball people in Ukraine
Arkansas–Fort Smith Lady Lions basketball players
Basketball players from Chicago
DePaul Blue Demons women's basketball players
Guards (basketball)
Junior college women's basketball players in the United States
Utah Starzz draft picks
Utah Starzz players